WSOJ-LP is a low power FM religious radio station in McMinnville, Tennessee, United States.  The station is on 102.5 FM.  The radio station broadcasts the teachings and singing of the Churches of Christ.

External links
WSOJ official website

SOJ-LP
SOJ-LP
Warren County, Tennessee
Churches of Christ
2004 establishments in Tennessee
Radio stations established in 2004